"Wee Willie Winkie" is a Scottish nursery rhyme whose titular figure has become popular as a personification of sleep. The poem was written by William Miller and titled "Willie Winkie", first published in Whistle-binkie: Stories for the Fireside in 1841. It has a Roud Folk Song Index number of 13711.

Lyrics 

The original text of 1841 in Scots, and a paraphrased version for English-language readers (from 1844) are below:

Origins and meaning 
The poem was written by William Miller (1810–1872), first printed in Whistle-binkie: Stories for the Fireside in 1841 and re-printed in Whistle-Binkie; a Collection of Songs for the Social Circle published in 1873. In Jacobite songs Willie Winkie referred to King William III of England, one example being "The Last Will and Testament of Willie winkie" but it seems likely that Miller was simply using the name rather than writing a Jacobite satire.

Such was the popularity of Wee Willie Winkie that the character has become one of several bedtime entities such as the Sandman, Ole Lukøje of Scandinavia, Klaas Vaak of the Netherlands, Dormette of France and  Billy Winker in Lancashire.

Notes

External links
Scottish Nursery Songs and other Poems by William Miller at Dennistoun online, includes Wee Willie Winkie
Whistle-Binkie; a Collection of Songs for the Social Circle edited by John Donald Carrick, Alexander Rodger, David Robertson, contains Willie Winkie and the autograph of Miller (1873)

Scots language
1841 in Scotland
1841 poems
Scottish children's literature
Songs about fictional male characters
Scottish folk songs
Scottish nursery rhymes
Scottish poems
Male characters in literature
Child characters in literature
Traditional children's songs
Scottish children's songs